Lalpur is a major suburb in Ranchi, Jharkhand, India. It is an upscale mixed used commercial - residential mixed used suburb neighbourhood in Ranchi. This is one of the major, main and important commercial suburbs of the city.

This place has a number of shopping malls and shopping complexes. Here is the famous Nucleus shopping mall. Numerous markets and marketplaces are located in this area.

Lalpur is one of the major commercial areas of the city along with Hindpiri, Lower Bazar and Upper Bazar. There are many hotels in Lalpur, and this locality houses many commercial properties and residential properties. Here are two famous and popular cinemas, and a number of hospitals and clinics.

Intersections

Lalpur Chowk 
Lalpur Chowk, an important locality of Lalpur, Ranchi, Jharkhand state, is an intersection of Circular Road and Old Hazaribagh Road (Old HB Road). The word chowk is a Hindi word meaning intersection. The area has several shops and important commercial establishments. Circular Road ends at the subsequent chowk, namely, Dangratoli Chowk, where it meets Purulia Road. In the opposite direction, the  Circular Road takes one to Kutchery area of Ranchi. From there, it forks to Ratu Road and Kanke Road. Old HB Road continues until it meets the new Hazaribagh Road. In the opposite direction it leads to Firayalal chowk, which is also one of the busiest intersections in Ranchi. Lalpur Chowk also leads to Peace Road.

There are major residential areas around Lalpur chowk: Burdwan Compound, BSNL colony, PN Bose Compound, etc. Burdwan Compound has a large population of Bengalis. Burdwan Compound is so named because it was the estate of the king of Burdwan, a district in West Bengal.

Shopping Malls 
Nucleus Shopping Mall in Lalpur is one of the largest and most popular shopping malls in the city of Ranchi. This mall was established in 2017.

This shopping mall has branded shops and stores (although tentative) such as Allen Solly, Arvind, Max, Big Bazaar, Monte Carlo, Hush Puppies, Nike, John Cooper and many more etc. Mall De-Cor is another major shopping mall in the city, located in Lalpur.

Hospitals 
There are a few hospitals located here: KC Roy Memorial Hospital, Orchid Medical Centre, Vellore Children's Hospital, Prabhawati Hospital, etc. Certain medical clinics are also situated in Lalpur.

Business Centers 
Sanfo Business Center is a popular business center in the city. Amravati Complex in Lalpur is another major business center.

Cinemas 
S.R.S Cinemas in Lalpur is a popular cinema hall in this area. This cinema hall is located at Sandhya Tower, Ajit Enclave in Lalpur. Plaza Cinema is another movie theatre in the area. PVR Cinemas, another cinema hall, is housed in Nucleus mall.

References 

Ranchi
Neighbourhoods in Jharkhand